Mir Hamzah or Shaykh Mir Hamzah is a Pakistani Islamic jihadist who was one of the five signatories of a 1998 fatwa from the World Islamic Front.

See also
History of Pakistan
List of fatwas

References
World Islamic Front Statement (23 February 1998). Jihad Against Jews and Crusaders. via fas.org

Year of birth missing (living people)
Living people
Place of birth missing (living people)